The War of the Emboabas was a conflict in colonial Brazil waged in 1706-1707 and 1708-1709 over newly discovered gold fields, which had set off a rush to the region between two generations of Portuguese settlers in the viceroyalty of Brazil - then the Captaincy of São Vicente. The discovery of gold set off a rush to the region,  Paulistas asserted rights of discovery and non-Paulistas challenged their claims. Although the Portuguese crown sought more control in the area and the Paulistas sought protection of their claims, the Emoboabas won. The crown re-assessed its position in the region and made administrative changes subsequently.

History
Starting from the village of São Paulo dos Campos de Piratininga (now São Paulo) the Bandeirantes had explored most of what is now southeastern and southwestern Brazil, effectively taking advantage of the union of the Crowns of Portugal and Spain from 1580 to 1640 to incorporate all the former Spanish territories then west of the Tordesilhas Line. Their goal was to capture new Indian slaves (which put them in conflict with the Jesuit Reductions), recapture runaway slaves and find precious minerals.

Their search was rewarded in an area just north of their original Capitania, until then inaccessible, which became Minas dos Matos Gerais and is now Minas Gerais. However the mines, while rich, were in a vast area they could not effectively settle, so theynattracted a gold rush from Portugal. The newcomers, called Emboabas, found an alternative, shorter route to the sea; the Caminho Novo das Minas dos Matos Gerais to São Sebastião do Rio de Janeiro on Guanabara Bay, bypassing and alienating the original discoverers.

The Bandeirantes, or Paulistas, tried to assert rights of precedence but were defeated.  As a result, the provinces of Minas Gerais and Rio de Janeiro were formed, their capital cities of Vila Rica do Ouro Preto and São Sebastião do Rio de Janeiro, respectively, became the new centers of power in the vice-kingdom of Brazil. São Sebastião (later shortened to its present name of Rio de Janeiro) became the capital city of the viceroyalty and later of the United Kingdom of Portugal, Brazil and the Algarves.

As soon as news of the discovery of gold spread thousands of outsiders moved to the area and became known pejoratively as "Emboabas". The term is derived from the Tupi mbóaba which literally means "hairy leg" (mbo (leg) + tab (hairy)). Originally the term referred to birds with feathered legs and as, unlike the Paulista pioneers, the outsiders always wore knee-high boots with their trousers tucked in, giving them the name.

 

Alternatively, according to the Dicionário Houaiss emboaba could be derived from the Tupi words mbo (do) and tab (hurt) meaning "those who invade or attack" and would be applied to a group rather than an individual.

Consequences

 Regulation of the distribution of mines between Emboabas and Paulistas.
 Regulation of collection of the quinto do ouro tax.
 Breakup on 3 November 1709 of the Province of São Vicente into São Paulo e Minas de Ouro and Rio de Janeiro, ruled directly by the Crown.
 São Paulo attained city status.
 End of the wars in the mining areas with the crown assuming the administrative control of the region.
 The defeat of Paulistas caused some of them to move west where, years later, they would discover new gold deposits in the current states of Mato Grosso do Sul, Mato Grosso and Goiás.
 The production of gold after the war increased so that Minas Gerais became the richest region of Brazil between 1740 and 1760.

References

Further reading

Cardozo, Manoel S. "The Guerra dos Emboabas, Civli War in Minas Gerais, 1708-1709". Hispanic American Historical Review 22 (August 1942), 470-492.
 Boxer, Charles R. The Golden Age of Brazil, 1695-1750. 1964.
 Franco, Francisco de Assis Carvalho, "Dicionário de Bandeirantes e Sertanistas do Brasil", Ed. São Paulo University, São Paulo, Ed Itatiaia, Belo Horizonte (1989)
 Leme, Pedro Taques de Almeida Paes, "Nobiliarquia Paulistana Histórica e Genealógica", Ed. São Paulo University (1980, São Paulo). 
 Mello, José Soares de. Emboabas. São Paulo: Governo do estado de São Paulo, 1942.
 Miranda, Ana. "O retrato do rei" São Paulo: Companhia das Letras, 1991. Romance brasileiro.
 Taunay, Afonso de E., "Relatos Sertanistas", Ed. São Paulo University (1981, São Paulo) 
 Taunay, Afonso de E., "História das Bandeiras Paulistas", Ed. Melhoramentos (São Paulo) 
 Ribeiro, Berta. O índio na história do Brasil. Editora Global, 1987.

1700s conflicts
1700s in Brazil
Colonial Brazil
Wars involving Brazil
Wars involving Portugal
History of Minas Gerais
History of São Paulo (state)